Eleale pulcher is a species of checkered beetle in the family Cleridae, found in Australia.

References

External links

 

Clerinae
Beetles described in 1840